Back to Front is the first compilation album by American singer Lionel Richie, which was released on May 5, 1992, by Motown Records. It contains songs from both his successful solo career and as part of the band the Commodores, along with three new tracks (1–3). The international version of the album also includes the tracks "Dancing on the Ceiling" and "Stuck on You". It debuted atop both the UK Albums Chart and the ARIA Albums Chart, and spent 12 weeks at number one on the Dutch Album Top 100. The single "Do It To Me" reached #21 at US Hot 100.

Track listing
All songs performed by Lionel Richie, unless stated otherwise.

Personnel 
Tracks 1, 2 & 3
 Lionel Richie – lead vocals, keyboards, rhythm arrangements, vocal arrangements, backing vocals (1, 2)
 Brad Cole – synthesizers, synthesizer programming
 Michael Landau – guitars (1, 2, 3)
 David Williams – guitars (2)
 Freddie Washington – bass
 Quincy Jones III – drum programming (1, 2)
 Jim Keltner – drums (3)
 Lenny Castro – percussion 
 Marc Russo – saxophone solo (1)
 Stewart Levine – rhythm arrangements
 Paul Buckmaster – horn and string orchestrations (2, 3)
 Jim Gilstrap, Terry Holcomb, Marva King, Darlene Koldenhoven, Laura Lombardo, Benjamin McCrary, Quincy McCrary, Eve Reinhardt, Alice Sanderson, Richard Stuart, Carmen Twillie and Myla Twillie – backing vocals (3)

Track 7
 Lionel Richie – lead vocals, vocal arrangements 
 Diana Ross – lead vocals
 Reginald "Sonny" Burke – Fender Rhodes
 Barnaby Finch – acoustic piano 
 Paul Jackson Jr. – electric guitar, acoustic guitar solo 
 Fred Tackett – guitar 
 Nathan East – bass 
 Rick Shlosser – drums 
 Gene Page – horn, rhythm and string arrangements 
 Harry Bluestone – concertmaster

Production 
 Stewart Levine – producer (1, 2, 3)
 Lionel Richie – producer (1-4, 7, 8, 10–15)
 James Anthony Carmichael – producer (4, 5, 6, 8-16)
 Commodores – producers (5, 6, 9, 14, 16)
 Darren Klein – recording (1, 2, 3), mixing (1, 2, 3)
 Marnie Riley – assistant engineer (1, 2, 3)
 Reginald Dozier – engineer (7)
 Guy Costa – mixing (7)
 Bernie Grundman – mastering 
 Johnny Lee – art direction, design 
 Matthew Rolston – photography

Studios 
 Tracks 1, 2 & 3 recorded and mixed at Conway Studios (Hollywood, California).
 Track 7 recorded at Devonshire Sound Studios (Hollywood, California). Mixed at Motown Recording Studios (West Hollywood, California).
 Mastered at Bernie Grundman Mastering (Hollywood, California).

Charts

Weekly charts

Year-end charts

Certifications and sales

References

1992 compilation albums
Lionel Richie albums
Motown compilation albums
Albums arranged by Paul Buckmaster